Motionless in White is an American metalcore band. The discography of the group consists of six full-length albums, two EPs and one demo album. The group is known to combine the metalcore musical style with industrial and gothic influences. The band recorded their demo in 2005 as a four-piece band, and released their debut EP, The Whorror under small independent label, Masquerade Recordings in 2007 when the group achieved a six-member line-up.

During the EP recording of When Love Met Destruction, the band signed to Fearless Records where they released their major label debut, Creatures afterward in 2010. The band released their second studio album, Infamous, on November 13, 2012. The band released their third studio album Reincarnate on September 16, 2014. The band signed to Roadrunner Records where they released their fourth studio album Graveyard Shift on May 5, 2017. Their fifth album Disguise was released on June 7, 2019. Their recent album Scoring the End of the World was released on June 10, 2022.

Albums

Studio albums

Demos

Extended plays

Singles

Promotional singles

Non-album tracks

Music videos

References

Discography
Heavy metal group discographies
Discographies of American artists